Simone Vaudry (25 February 1906 – 3 January 1993) was a French film actress, most of whose films were made during the silent era.

Selected filmography
 L'épingle rouge (1921)
 The Black Sheep (1922)
 Vingt ans après (1922)
 The Mysteries of Paris (1922)
 Mimi Pinson (1924)
 Mylord l'Arsouille (1925)
 Fanfan la Tulipe (1925)
 The Woman's Crusade (1926)
 The Master of Death (1926)
 The Porter from Maxim's (1927)
 The Sea (1927)
 Homesick (1927)
 Odette (1928)
 The Mystery of the Villa Rose (1930)
 When Do You Commit Suicide? (1931)
 The Eaglet (1931)
 Les amours de Pergolèse (1932)
 Three Lucky Fools (1933)

Bibliography
 King, Norman. Abel Gance: A Politics of Spectacle. British Film Institute, 1984.

External links

1906 births
1993 deaths
French film actresses
French silent film actresses
Actresses from Paris
20th-century French actresses